Albert Yasuro Muratsuchi (born September 4, 1964) is an American politician serving the California State Assembly. A Democrat, he represents the 66th Assembly District, encompassing parts of the South Bay region of Los Angeles, including the cities of Torrance, Manhattan Beach, and Redondo Beach.

Prior to his service in the Assembly, he was a deputy California Attorney General, trustee for the Torrance Unified School District, and trustee for the Southern California Regional Occupation Center.  First elected to the Assembly in 2012 to represent the 66th Assembly District, Muratsuchi was narrowly defeated in his 2014 bid for reelection by Republican David Hadley in a major upset. In a 2016 rematch with Hadley, he reclaimed his old Assembly seat. He has held the seat since then.

Personal life 
Muratsuchi was born on September 4, 1964, and grew up on U.S. military bases in Okinawa, Japan. His father, a 2nd-generation Japanese American, was a civilian employee of the United States Army, and his mother came from Gifu Prefecture. Due to his father's job he was raised on various military bases overseas. He attended the University of California, Berkeley and UCLA School of Law.

Career 
Muratsuchi was a prosecutor in the California Department of Justice and served as a Deputy Attorney General. He also served as the regional director of the Japanese American Citizens League Pacific Southwest District.

Political career

Legislative committee assignments 
Chairman of the Joint Legislative Committee on Climate Change Policies, Chairman of the Assembly Budget Subcommittee on Education Finance, and Chairman of the Assembly Select Committee on Aerospace. Member of: Assembly Committee on Natural Resources, Assembly Judiciary Committee, Assembly Budget Committee, and Veterans Affairs.

Appointments to Board and Commission: California Coastal Conservancy, Santa Monica Bay Restoration Commission, Governor Brown's Military Council, Inter-agency Veterans Council.

Environment 
In 2020, Muratsuchi introduced AB-345, which would have required a minimum setback distance of 2,500 feet between oil wells and public areas where children are present and public notices of potential consequences to local communities. He has said that there was strong opposition from oil and gas industry trade unions, whom the Los Angeles Times has noted are major supporters of Democratic candidates. The bill failed in the Senate Natural Resources and Water Committee in a 5–4 decision. State Senator Robert Hertzberg, who made the pivotal vote, said that he opposed the bill because Governor Gavin Newsom has already signed a bill in 2019 with similar intentions of setting up buffer zones. However, Muratsuchi has noted that Newsom has not made a definite commitment to do so.

Election results 
After reclaiming office in 2016, Muratsuchi has retained the seat with comfortable electoral margins. He was reelected over former Torrance Mayor Frank A. Scotto in 2018. In 2020, he was reelected by a wide margin over Arthur C. Schaper, whom the Southern Poverty Law Center called a "longtime anti-immigrant and nativist activist."  In 2022, he was reelected over former Hermosa Beach Mayor George Barks.

District 66

References

External links 
 
 Campaign website
 Join California Albert Muratsuchi

American politicians of Japanese descent
Democratic Party members of the California State Assembly
Living people
California politicians of Japanese descent
People from Torrance, California
People from Okinawa Prefecture
1964 births
21st-century American politicians
People from Rolling Hills Estates, California